The Money Drop Myanmar is a Burmese reality television game show which is airing on Channel 7. It is based on British Gameshow, Million Pound Drop. The show has been airing since 2017.

Game format

This show can be participated with two contestants. Contestants are presented with eight multiple-choice questions. Contestants will get Ks.2,50,00,000/- for answer this questions.

At the beginning of each round, they will be given two categories to choose one.  Each of the first four questions contains four possible answers and the next three have three and the last two. It has different drops and one is the correct answer. Then they asked the question, contestants will choose in a set time (60 seconds) to split all the money.

If the contestants are unsure about this question, they may distribute as much as two or more money as they think is necessary. Contestants will cancel one drop and splits the money on the other drops. Contestants can stop at any time if they are satisfied with their choice.

If the timer is stopped or the time has elapsed, it will open up for incorrect answers. The rest of the money left on the correct answer may go to the next question. This process is repeated until the last question is answered. If the contestants correctly answer the final question, all the remaining money will be owned.

References

External links
 

Burmese television series
Television game shows
Endemol Shine Group franchises
Channel 7 (Myanmar) original programming